This is a list of electoral results for the Electoral district of Wembley Beaches in Western Australian state elections.

Members for Wembley Beaches

Election results

Elections in the 1950s

 Two party preferred vote was estimated.

References

Western Australian state electoral results by district